Dhruv Pratap Singh, also known as Deepak Bhaiya (born 4 August 1960) is an Indian politician from Madhya Pradesh, India. At present he is the Chairman of Katni Development Authority, Madhya Pradesh. He is the member of The Bharatiya Janata Party (BJP).

Political career
Dhruv Pratap Singh became active in politics after he sought the membership of Bhartiya Janta Party in 1980, and from the years 1988–2002 (14 years) he was the Mandal Adyaksh from Badwara. Dhruv Pratap Singh gained momentum in his political career in 1998, when Bhartiya Janta Party nominated him as their candidate for the state elections from the Badwara constituency in 1998, he lost the elections with a minor margin of 2000 votes to the Congress candidate. In the 2003 state elections, Bhartiya Janta Party nominated him again but from a different constituency, Vijayraghavgarh as the party felt that he was more suited and could give stiff competition to the Congress candidate, Satyendra Pathak, who apart from being a state minister was a powerful adversary. Dhruv Pratap Singh defeated him by a huge margin of 13,000 votes, and become Member of Madhya Pradesh Legislative Assembly in 2003 from the Vijayraghavgarh (114) constituency. In the 2008 state elections, BJP nominated him for the third and for the second time from Vijayraghavgarh constituency. He lost the elections to the Congress candidate. Following the defeat in the elections the party nominated him as the District Party President of Katni District, Madhya Pradesh in 2010, reaffirming their faith in him. The party held the belief that he is very popular and holds a lot of ground in both the constituencies, Katni and Vijayraghavgarh, which was upheld by the party nomination.

Life
Dhruv Pratap Singh belongs to the Sisodia Family of Katni, his forefathers migrated from the Dev region of Bihar and settled in and around the Katni district. He belongs to the fifth generation of the Sisodias settled in Katni. His father Kunwar Vijendra Singh was an active politician for more than 35 years, and contested the state elections for consecutively five times from the Badwara constituency in the years 1977 to 1998. In year 1977, 1980 and 1990 Kunwar Vijayendra Singh contested elections as an independent candidate, and BJP nominated him as their candidate in 1985 and 1993 state elections and he played a major role in establishing The Bhartiya Janta Party in the 70s, 80s and 90s in Katni district. He is now mentor to his son and continues to guide him through his political career, and continues to be a popular name in the region.

References

External links
Katnidevelopmentauthority.com
Eci.nic.in
Mpinfo.org

1960 births
Living people
Madhya Pradesh MLAs 2003–2008
Bharatiya Janata Party politicians from Madhya Pradesh